Abbotsford School District  (also known as School District 34) is a school district in the Fraser Valley of British Columbia. The district is located in the city of Abbotsford. It has seen steady growth as a result of Abbotsford's place as one of the fastest-growing cities in North America.

Career and technical programs are offered at various secondary schools in the school district.

Schools

See also
List of school districts in British Columbia

 Lower Mainland
 Education in Abbotsford, British Columbia
34